The 2017 1. divisjon was the second tier of Norwegian women's football in 2017. The season kicked off on 17 April 2017, finishing on 4 November 2017.

The top placed team was be promoted to next year's Toppserien. The second placed team contested a playoff against the 11th placed team from the 2017 Toppserien for the right to play in Toppserien next season.

Table
 Lyn − promoted
 Urædd
 Øvrevoll Hosle
 Byåsen
 Bossekop
 Åsane
 Fløya
 Grei
 Amazon Grimstad
 Fart
 KIL/Hemne − relegated
 Kongsvinger − relegated

References

External links
Fotball.no

2017
2
Norway
Norway